Laevidentalium is a genus of molluscs belonging to the family Laevidentaliidae.

The genus has cosmopolitan distribution.

Species
Species:

Laevidentalium abyplaine V.Scarabino & F.Scarabino, 2011
Laevidentalium ambiguum (Chenu, 1843)
Laevidentalium coruscum (Pilsbry, 1905)
Laevidentalium didymum (Watson, 1879)
Laevidentalium eburneum (Linnaeus, 1767)
Laevidentalium ensiforme (Chenu, 1842)
Laevidentalium erectum (G.B.Sowerby II, 1860)
Laevidentalium fodinense P.A.Maxwell, 1988
Laevidentalium gofasi Scarabino, 1995
Laevidentalium houbricki Scarabino, 1995
Laevidentalium incertum (Deshayes, 1825)
Laevidentalium jaffaense (Cotton & Ludbrook, 1938)
Laevidentalium largicrescens (Tate, 1899)
Laevidentalium leptosceles (R.B.Watson, 1879)
Laevidentalium longitrorsum (Reeve, 1842)
Laevidentalium lubricatum (G.B.Sowerby II, 1860)
Laevidentalium marshae Lamprell & Healy, 1998
Laevidentalium martyi Lamprell & Healy, 1998
Laevidentalium morganianum Wilckens, 1922
Laevidentalium philippinarum (Sowerby, 1860)
Laevidentalium rectius (Carpenter, 1864)
Laevidentalium translucidum (Deshayes, 1826)
Laevidentalium waihoraense Emerson, 1954
Laevidentalium wiesei Sahlmann, 2012
Laevidentalium zeidleri Lamprell & Healy, 1998

References

Molluscs